"Ikaw" (You) is a hit song written and recorded by Filipino singer-songwriter Yeng Constantino, released as the lead single from her album All About Love. The song became the most played OPM song of 2014 and is currently the second most viewed music video by a Filipino female artist on YouTube with over 100 million views as of June 2020, behind Sarah Geronimo's "Tala".

Background and composition 
The song was written by Yeng Constantino with vocal production and arrangement by Jonathan Manalo, musical arrangement by Ria Villena-Osorio. It was produced by Ria Villena-Osorio, Yeng Constantino, Champ Lui Pio, Tim Mejia and Jonathan Manalo and released under Star Music Philippines.

Music video 
The official music video was released on August 23, 2014. It serves as the unofficial prenuptial video of Yeng Constantino and then fiancé Yan Asuncion. It was directed by Cristhian Escolano.

Cover versions 
Daryl Ong recorded a cover of the song which was later used in the teleserye FPJ's Ang Probinsyano.

Korean singer Yohan Hwang covered the song in Korean entitled "Neoege (너에게)" for the Philippine broadcast of the Korean drama series Love In the Moonlight.

Live performances 

Yeng Constantino performed the song on ASAP stage with Yan Asuncion on December 7, 2014, she also performed the song on Wish 107.5 bus on April 4, 2015 and on Net 25's Letters and Music in February 2016.

Chart position

On June 12, 2017, the official Philippine Billboard charts was launched. "Ikaw" debuted at number 4 on the Catalog Charts, a chart for local songs that were released for over three years in the Philippines but still generate sales and streaming activity data.

Awards and nominations 
The song won "Song of the Year" award on both PMPC Star Awards for Music and Awit Awards.

Re-Recording 

Yeng Constantino re-recorded the song to become the official soundtrack of the movie of the same name starring Janine Gutierrez, Pepe Herrera and Pilita Corrales. It was released on 12 November 2021.

References 

Yeng Constantino songs
2014 songs
2014 singles
Star Music singles
Tagalog-language songs